Thomas Hooker is a Republican politician from the U.S. state of Michigan. He is currently a member of the Michigan House of Representatives, representing the 77th District which covers the city of Wyoming and Byron Township. Representative Hooker was elected in 2010 and is currently serving his third term as a State Representative. Prior to becoming a member of the Michigan House, Hooker was a school teacher in the Byron Center School District for 37 years. He is being term-limited in 2016, and on August 2, 2016, he won the primary race to be the Republican nominee for Byron Township Supervisor.

Education
Representative Hooker earned a bachelor's degree from Grand Valley State University and a master's degree from Western Michigan University.

References

Grand Valley State University alumni
Western Michigan University alumni
Republican Party members of the Michigan House of Representatives
Living people
1950 births
21st-century American politicians
People from Wyoming, Michigan
Schoolteachers from Michigan